Archaeospheniscus is an extinct genus of large penguins. It currently contains three species, known from somewhat fragmentary remains. A. wimani, the smallest species (about the size of a gentoo penguin), was found in Middle or Late Eocene strata (34-50 MYA) of the La Meseta Formation on Seymour Island, Antarctica, whereas the other two, about the size of a modern emperor penguin, are known from bones recovered from the Late Oligocene Kokoamu Greensand Formation (27-28 MYA) at Duntroon, New Zealand.

The genus is one of the earliest known primitive penguins. Its humerus is still very slender, between the form seen in ordinary bird wings and the thickened condition found in modern penguins. On the other hand, the tarsometatarsus shows a peculiar mix of characters found in modern and primitive forms. Whether this signifies that the genus is an ancestor of modern taxa or represents a case of parallel evolution is unknown.

Species 
 Archaeospheniscus lowei
 Archaeospheniscus lopdelli
 Archaeospheniscus wimani

References
 Jadwiszczak, Piotr (2006): Eocene penguins of Seymour Island, Antarctica: Taxonomy. Polish Polar Research 27(1): 3–62. PDf fulltext
 Marples, Brian J. (1952): Early Tertiary penguins of New Zealand. New Zealand Geol. Surv., Paleont. Bull. 20: 1-66.
 Simpson, George Gaylord (1971): A review of the pre-Pleistocene penguins of New Zealand. Bulletin of the American Museum of Natural History 144: 319–378. PDF fulltext

 
Bird genera
Extinct penguins
Eocene birds
Oligocene birds
Prehistoric birds of Antarctica
Fossil taxa described in 1952
Taxa named by Brian John Marples